Halloran Springs is a set of springs in the Mojave Desert in San Bernardino County, California, United States.

The ZIP code is 92309 and the community is inside area codes 442 and 760.

References

Reference bibliography 

Populated places in the Mojave Desert
Unincorporated communities in San Bernardino County, California
Unincorporated communities in California